The Colonial British government criminalized Lesbian, gay, bisexual, and transgender (LGBT) activities in India under section 377 of the Indian Penal code of 1860. Pakistan gained independence in 1947 and adapted the same laws regarding LGBT under the Pakistan Penal Code. The Pakistan Penal Code states, "Whoever voluntarily has carnal intercourse against the order of nature with any man, woman or animal, shall be punished with imprisonment for life, or with imprisonment of either description for a term which shall not be less than two years nor more than ten years, and shall also be liable to fine.

In the 1980s, the rules against LGBT community stiffened even more under the sixth president of Pakistan; General Muhammad Zia-ul-Haq. The punishment for homosexual activities increased to life imprisonment or even death by stoning as a result of the Sharia Law added to Pakistan Penal Code. Homosexuality was somewhat supportive in major cities e.g. in Lahore and in Karachi there were secret gay parties during the regime of General Pervez Musharraf; Ali Saleem, son of a retired army colonel, appeared in television disguising as a woman, he openly talked about his sexuality that he is bisexual.

The religious leaders of Pakistan have consistently forbidden and condemned LGBT activities as being immoral under the constitution of Islam. In accordance with Islamic Law, Homosexual marriage is condemned and not recognized as legitimate.

People in Pakistan who consider themselves to be a part of the LGBT community do not expose their sexual preference in public due to the fear of being looked down upon or physically attacked.

Transgender community in Pakistan is "tolerated" and is believed to possess supernatural power of cursing people. They are the outcasts of the society and work as beggars, street dancers & prostitutes. Mostly a patriarch society, it is the men who call out to them and against them. There is even a belief among people that transgender people are just prostitutes for money. Religious clerics would declare them haraam(sinful), un-natural, inhuman and aliens and call upon the society to have no connections or interactions with them.Trans-teens are usually kept a family secret and are considered a disgrace and matter of family shame. They are either sold-off for as low as $200 or just left on their own. They have little choice but to work for survival, and without help from family, friends, community or government there are few options.

Pakistan has been known to foster practices like Bacha bazi and/or Dancing boys in its northwestern province. There are several self-declared vigilante groups who patrol the countryside looking to catch people in the act and punish them.

Muhammad Ejaz, a paramedic in Pakistan, entered the homes of three men in Lahore he met on the gay social networking site, Manjam, and killed them. Two of the men were in their 20s and one was middle-aged retired army major. Eijaz stated, "I tried to convince them to stop their dirty acts, but they would not, so I decided to kill them". The social networking site, Manjam, has since then not allowed any Pakistani individuals to sign up on their site for security reasons. Eijaz was taken into custody by the Pakistani Police which insisted that he had sex with the victims before killing them.

Violence against the LGBT Community 
Cases of violence against members of the LGBT community are very common in Pakistan. Members of the LGBT community in Pakistan rarely report assaults committed against them to the police, in fact The Immigration and Refugee Board of Canada (IRBC) noted in January 2014 that if an LGBT person who faced threats from family or community members went to the police, the police "may become an accomplice rather than a protector."

According to TransAction Alliance, as of June 2016 there were more than 300 cases of violence against transgender people in Khyber Pakhtunkhwa alone, and 46 transgender people had been killed since January 2015. There are reports that show that violence against transgender individuals has been increasing every year. Very often when these cases are reported to the police they may be met with inaction or indifference.

Actions 
After a long period of public protests and appeals, In 2009, Supreme Court of Pakistan legally recognized transgender people as a third gender promising them Computerised National Identity Card (CNIC). The court also directed government agencies and offices to employ transgender people but that hasn't seen much traction. However, Cantonment Board Faisal (CBF) gave out an advertisement for employment of transgender people as in Tax Recovery. As many as 15 transgender people were employed on the first advert. Government has also issued voter cards for the transgender community.

Social and dating platforms like Tinder, Manjam, Grindr and Scruff are helping create an online community. With NGOs like NAZ Male Health Alliance founded by Kasim Iqbal, the LGBTQ community is coming together and helping each other. They enjoy partial freedom and covertly live life their way.

See also 
 Violence against LGBT people
 LGBT rights in Pakistan

References

Other websites

 Islam e Omosessualità - Allah Loves Equality

External links
Being LGBT in the Islamic Republic of Pakistan, by Vice News

Pakistan
History of Pakistan
LGBT history in Pakistan